Kalwa is a small village in Nagaur district, Rajasthan, India.

References 

Delimitation Commission Report

Villages in Nagaur district